The 2005 Parramatta Eels season was the 59th in the club's history. Coached by Brian Smith and captained by Nathan Cayless, they competed in the NRL's 2005 Telstra Premiership. The Eels finished the home and away season on top of the ladder to claim the minor premiership, but were knocked out in the preliminary final, going down 0–29 to the North Queensland Cowboys.

Summary
The 2005 season marked a resurgence of the Parramatta Eels; after two years in the wilderness, the club were back into premiership contention after ending the season as minor premiers on 36 points, ahead of the St. George Illawarra Dragons on points differential. The first week of the 2005 Finals Series saw a comfortable 46–22 win over the Manly-Warringah Sea Eagles, who were in their first finals campaign since the creation of the National Rugby League in 1998. Following the week off, Parramatta were beaten by the Johnathan Thurston-led North Queensland at ANZ Stadium, 29–0, ending another season in disappointment. 

Adding further salt to the wound, Parramatta's inspirational forward Nathan Hindmarsh missed the entire finals series and popular cult figure Fuifui Moimoi was suspended in the final round of the season, also missing the finals. Parramatta had also defeated eventual premiers the Wests Tigers twice throughout the season, defeated St. George Illawarra and also recorded a 50-12 victory over North Queensland earlier in the year.

Standings

Awards
The following awards were awarded in the post-season:
Michael Cronin Clubman of the Year Award: Mark Riddell
Ken Thornett Medal (Players' Player): Nathan Cayless/Timana Tahu
Jack Gibson Award (Coach's Award): Glenn Morrison
Eric Grothe Rookie of the Year Award: Tim Smith

References

Parramatta Eels seasons
Parramatta Eels season